is a Japanese football player currently playing for Oita Trinita.

Club Team career statistics
Updated to 7 December 2019.

1Includes Suruga Bank Championship.

References

External links
Profile at Oita Trinita 

1989 births
Living people
Association football people from Ōita Prefecture
Japanese footballers
J1 League players
J2 League players
Oita Trinita players
Giravanz Kitakyushu players
Association football midfielders